Hopea jucunda is a species of plant in the family Dipterocarpaceae. It is endemic to the island of Sri Lanka.

Uses
Wood - construction timber.

Culture

Sources
 
 http://www.boldsystems.org/index.php/Taxbrowser_Taxonpage?taxid=443594
 https://www.researchgate.net/publication/244514431_Balanocarpol_a_new_polyphenol_from_Balanocarpus_zeylanicus(trimen)_and_Hopea_jucunda(Thw.)(Dipterocarpaceae)
 http://plants.jstor.org/specimen/k000700737
 http://pubs.rsc.org/en/Content/ArticleLanding/1985/P1/P19850001807
 http://www.theplantlist.org/tpl/record/kew-2853186

jucunda
Endemic flora of Sri Lanka
Trees of Sri Lanka
Critically endangered flora of Asia
Taxobox binomials not recognized by IUCN